Kevin Bray may refer to:
Kevin Bray (director), American film, television, commercial and music video director and producer
Kevin Bray (cricketer) (born 1968), former Australian cricketer